Leedale is a hamlet in central Alberta, Canada within Ponoka County.

Demographics 
Leedale recorded a population of 11 in the 1991 Census of Population conducted by Statistics Canada.

See also 
List of communities in Alberta
List of hamlets in Alberta

References 

Hamlets in Alberta
Ponoka County